Unionist Movement may refer to:

United Ulster Unionist Movement
Unionist Movement of the Republic of Moldova (MURM or Romanian: Mişcarea Unionistă din Republica Moldova)
Mișcarea Politică Unirea (MPU or Romanian: Union Political Movement), Moldova
Italian Unionist Movement, party active just after the end of World War II 
Unionist Movement (Colombia)

See also
unification movement